Derek Jamie "DJ" Forbes (born 15 December 1982) is a New Zealand former rugby union player and captain of the All Blacks Sevens team. Forbes is part Samoan, and also played rugby fifteens as a loose forward for Counties Manukau.

Forbes was born in Auckland, New Zealand. Since receiving the captaincy role in 2006, he played in over 80 tournaments, won six Sevens Series titles and won one Gold and one Silver Commonwealth Games medal. Forbes stepped down as captain for the All Blacks Sevens to concentrate on earning a spot in the team for the 2016 Olympics.

His uncle is the late former Samoan international Peter Fatialofa.

Forbes was awarded the 2008 New Zealand Samoan Sportsperson of the year. He announced his retirement from rugby sevens in 2017. He appeared in 512 games in 89 tournaments and won six World Series.

Awards
 IRB International Sevens Player of the Year 2008
 New Zealand Samoan Sports Association Sportsperson of the Year 2008

References

External links
 Sevens Profile 
 

New Zealand rugby union players
1982 births
Living people
World Rugby Awards winners
New Zealand people of Samoan descent
New Zealand international rugby sevens players
New Zealand male rugby sevens players
Rugby sevens players at the 2016 Summer Olympics
Counties Manukau rugby union players
Auckland rugby union players
Olympic rugby sevens players of New Zealand
People educated at Kelston Boys' High School
Commonwealth Games rugby sevens players of New Zealand
Commonwealth Games gold medallists for New Zealand
Rugby sevens players at the 2010 Commonwealth Games
Rugby sevens players at the 2014 Commonwealth Games
People educated by New Zealand Christian Brothers
Commonwealth Games medallists in rugby sevens
Commonwealth Games silver medallists for New Zealand
People educated at Liston College
Rugby union flankers
Medallists at the 2010 Commonwealth Games
Medallists at the 2014 Commonwealth Games